Motoi is a Japanese name which may refer to:
Motoi -motoi, the 8th song on the music album Amachan by Matsuko Mawatari.

People
Motoi Emi, voice actor
Motoi George, famous artist at the Cluj-Napoca National Theatre
Motoi Sakuraba, Japanese musician and composer
Motoi Oyama, Japanese businessman

Fictional characters
Yazaki Motoi, politician in Ghost Hound

Japanese-language surnames
Japanese masculine given names